The British School at Rome (BSR) is an interdisciplinary research centre supporting the arts, humanities and architecture.

History
The British School at Rome (BSR) was established in 1901 and granted a UK Royal Charter in 1912. Its mission is "to promote knowledge of and deep engagement with all aspects of the art, history and culture of Italy by scholars and fine artists from Britain and the Commonwealth, and to foster international and interdisciplinary exchange."

Following the International Exhibition of Art in Rome in 1911, the site of the Edwin Lutyens-designed British Pavilion in the Valle Giulia was granted to the UK on condition that it be used exclusively as a British research centre for archaeology, history and the fine arts. In 1916, after significant adaptation by Lutyens, the BSR moved into what is still its home. In 2002, a purpose-built lecture theatre and gallery spaces, designed by Hugh Petter and sponsored by the Sainsbury family, were opened by Princess Alexandra. The BSR is immediately adjacent to the Villa Borghese gardens and the Galleria Nazionale d'Arte Moderna.

Awards and fellowships
The BSR awards residential scholarships and fellowships to artists and scholars from the Commonwealth for periods of three to twelve months. The awardees live in the BSR building and have access to its specialist reference library.  Recipients of the fine art awards are provided with studio and workshop facilities.

Awards, based on an open access application system, are made in the following fields: Archaeology of Italy and the Mediterranean; Late Antique and Medieval History; Renaissance and Enlightenment studies; Modern Italian Studies; Architectural History; Architecture including Landscape Architecture; contemporary visual arts practice.

Fine Arts awards

Humanities awards

Governance and leadership 
The British School at Rome is one of the sponsored institutes of the British Academy, whilst maintaining itself as an autonomous body. It receives financial support from the British Academy, award sponsors, private donors and its membership, and is a registered charity under English law.

The BSR is led by a Director, who has traditionally been a senior scholar in the fields of Classical history, art history, or archaeology.

List of directors

 Gordon McNeil Rushforth – First Director
 Sir Henry Stuart-Jones (1903–1905)
 Thomas Ashby (1906–1925)
 Bernard Ashmole (1925–1928)
 Arthur Smith (1928–1930, 1932)
 Ian Richmond (1930–1932)
 Arthur Smith (1932) – Second term
 Colin Hardie (1933–1936)
 Ralegh Radford (1936–1939)
 No director during World War II (1939–1945)
 John Bryan Ward-Perkins (1946–1974)
 Dr David Whitehouse (1974–1984)
 Professor Donald A. Bullough (1984) – Acting Director
 Professor Graeme Barker (1984–1988)
 Professor Richard Hodges (1988–1995)
 Professor Andrew Wallace-Hadrill (1995–2009)
 Professor Christopher Smith (2009–2017)
 Professor Stephen Milner (2017–2020)
 Professor Chris Wickham (2020 – September 2021)
 Professor Abigail Brundin (September 2021 – present)

Notable alumni

Fine arts

Humanities

Bibliography
T. P. Wiseman, A Short History of the British School at Rome, 1990
A. Wallace-Hadrill, The British School at Rome: One Hundred Years, 2001

See also

References

External links
 The British School at Rome

British overseas research institutes
Foreign academies in Rome
Art schools in Italy
Educational institutions established in 1901
Classical educational institutes
Works of Edwin Lutyens
 
World's fair architecture in Italy
Schools with a royal charter
Charities based in Italy
1901 establishments in Italy